Brasileodactylus a genus of pterosaur from the Aptian-age (Early Cretaceous period) lower Santana formation of Chapada do Araripe, Ceará, Brazil.

The genus was named by paleontologist Alexander Wilhelm Armin Kellner in 1984. The genus name means 'pterosaur (literally, [wing] "finger") from Brazil'. The type species is Brasileodactylus araripensis. The specific name refers to the Araripe Plateau. The holotype, MN 4804-V, is the front part of a mandible.

Later remains referred to Brasileodactylus include SMNS 55414, a mandible, and MN 4797–V, the front of a snout and mandible. The last two specimens have been assigned to a Brasileodactylus sp. indet. by André Jacques Veldmeijer. However, some of the more complete specimens may belong to other pterosaurs, such as Barbosania.

Description
It had a long pointed snout and conical teeth that in the extreme front of the jaws were long, thin and forward pointing. Unlike some other Brazilian pterosaurs it had no crest on the snout or lower jaw but might have had one on the back of the skull.

Classification
Kellner first assigned Brasileodactylus to the Ornithocheiridae. In 1991 he changed that to a more cautious Pterodactyloidea incertae sedis. In 2000 he affirmed a close affinity to the Anhangueridae. David Unwin in 2001 considered the form part of Anhanguera but later retracted. Eberhard Frey in 2003 thought it was a species of Coloborhynchus. In 2007 Unwin and David Martill suggested Ludodactylus was a junior synonym of Brasileodactylus.

Below is a cladogram showing the results of a phylogenetic analysis presented by Andres et al., 2014.

See also
 Timeline of pterosaur research

References

Further reading 
 Kellner, A. W. A. (1984). "Ocorrência de uma mandibula de pterosauria (Brasileodactylus araripensis, nov. gen.; nov. sp.) na Formação Santana, Cretáceo da Chapada do Araripe, Ceará-Brasil." Anais XXXIII Cong. Brasil. de Geol, 578–590. Rio de Janeiro
 Frey, E. & Martill, D. M. (1994). "A new Pterosaur from the Crato Formation (Lower Cretaceous, Aptian) of Brazil." Neues Jahrbuch fur Geologie und Paläontology, Abhandlungen. 194: 379–412 
 Sayão, J. M. & Kellner, A. W. A. (2000). "Description of a pterosaur rostrum from the Crato Member, Santana Formation (Aptian-Albian) northeastern, Brazil." Boletim do Museu Nacional, 54: 1-8
 Kellner, A. W. A. and Tomida., Y. (2000). "Description of a new species of Anhangueridae (Pterodactyloidea) with comments on the pterosaur fauna from the Santana Formation (Aptian -Albian), Northeastern Brazil." National Science Museum Monographs No. 17, National Science Museum, Tokyo: 1-135
 Veldmeijer, A. J. (2003). "Preliminary description of a skull and wing of a Brazilian lower Cretaceous (Santana Formation; Aptian-Albian) pterosaur (Pterodactyloidea) in the collection of the AMNH." PalArch, series vertebrate palaeontology: 1-13
 Veldmeijer, A. J. (2006). "Toothed pterosaurs from the Santana Formation (Cretaceous; Aptian–Albian) of northeastern Brazil." (Doctoral dissertation, Utrecht University, 2006). Proefschrift Universiteit Utrecht, 1-269

Pteranodontoids
Early Cretaceous pterosaurs of South America
Cretaceous Brazil
Fossils of Brazil
Crato Formation
Romualdo Formation
Fossil taxa described in 1984
Taxa named by Alexander Kellner